Andi Mappanyukki, also spelt as Andi Mappanjukki, (1885 – 18 April 1967), was the 32nd and 34th King of Bone and an Indonesian rebel who fought against the Dutch from the 1920s to the 1930s. A National Hero of Indonesia, he was the father of Andi Abdullah Bau Massepe.

Born the son of I Makkulau Daeng Serang Karaeng Lembangparang, Sultan of Gowa, his father appointed him Lieutenant of the Royal Army of Gowa in 1905 after a rebellion against the Dutch broke out. When his father died, he continued with guerrilla warfare.

Dying on 18 April 1967, in Jongaya, he was buried at Panaikang Ujung Pandang with state honours, and later on November 10, 2004 declared a National Hero of Indonesia by Presidential Decree No. 089 / TK / TH 2004.

References

1885 births
1967 deaths
Indonesian revolutionaries
National Heroes of Indonesia